The 1983–84 Oklahoma Sooners men's basketball team represented the University of Oklahoma in competitive college basketball during the 1983–84 NCAA Division I season. The Oklahoma Sooners men's basketball team played its home games in the Lloyd Noble Center and was a member of the National Collegiate Athletic Association's (NCAA) former Big Eight Conference at that time.  The team posted a 29–5 overall record and a 13–1 conference record to finish first in the Conference for head coach Billy Tubbs.  This was the first Big Eight Conference Regular Season Championship for Tubbs.

The team was led by All American and Big Eight Conference Men's Basketball Player of the Year Wayman Tisdale. The team lost its second game at the Great Alaska Shootout. It then won eleven in a row before enduring its only conference loss at Iowa State. The team won the rest of its regular season games and the first two Big Eight Conference Tournament games bringing its win streak to 13. It lost the conference title game to Kansas. The team then lost its first game in the 1983 NCAA Division I men's basketball tournament to Dayton.

Over the course of the season, Wayman Tisdale established the current Oklahoma Sooners men's basketball single-season scoring average (27.0) and single-game points (61) records.

Roster

Schedule and results

|-
!colspan=9 style=| Regular Season

|-
!colspan=9 style=| Big Eight Tournament

|-
!colspan=9 style=| NCAA Tournament

NCAA basketball tournament

The following is a summary of the team's performance in the NCAA Division I men's basketball tournament:
West
 Dayton (10) 89, (2) Oklahoma 85

Honors
All-American: Wayman Tisdale (2nd of 3 times)
Big Eight POY: Tisdale

Team players drafted into the NBA
The following players were drafted in the 1984 NBA Draft:

The following players were varsity letter-winners from this team who were drafted in the NBA Draft in later years:

1985 NBA Draft: Wayman Tisdale (1st, 2nd, Indiana Pacers)
1987 NBA Draft: Tim McCalister (3rd, 47th, Los Angeles Clippers), David Johnson (4th, 89th, Dallas Mavericks), Darryl Kennedy (4th, 91st, Boston Celtics)

References

Oklahoma Sooners men's basketball seasons
Oklahoma
Oklahoma